Ladyhawke is a novel by Joan D. Vinge published in 1985.

Plot summary
Ladyhawke is a novelization of the film Ladyhawke.

Reception
Dave Langford reviewed Ladyhawke for White Dwarf #65, and stated that "Have fun spotting the obligatory film cliches - as when someone's running, hotly pursued, down an empty road; stumbles and falls; finds himself staring at mere inches' range at the boots (here hooves) of a previously unnoticed stranger. . . But Vinge's clear, witty writing makes up for much."

Reviews
Review by Anne Hudson Jones (1985) in Fantasy Review, August 1985
Review by Don D'Ammassa (1986) in Science Fiction Chronicle, #79 April 1986

References

1985 American novels
1985 fantasy novels
Novels based on films
Signet Books books